Williams v Compair Maxam Ltd [1982] ICR 156  is a UK labour law case, concerning unfair dismissal, now governed by the Employment Rights Act 1996.

Facts
Compair Maxam Ltd was losing business. Departmental managers picked teams of core staff who could be retained to keep the business viable. They chose on personal preference for what they thought would be good for the company, but the union was not consulted. Other employees were dismissed for redundancy and given money beyond statutory minima. Five workers claimed dismissal was unfair.

The Tribunal dismissed the claims, saying that the managers’ preferences were a reasonable way of doing the job. This was appealed on grounds of perversity.

Judgment
Browne-Wilkinson J said that there was an error of law by reaching a conclusion so perverse on the facts. The dismissal selection was unfair, ‘the correct approach is to consider whether an industrial tribunal, properly directed in law and properly appreciating what is currently regarded as fair industrial practice, could have reached the decision reached by the majority of this tribunal. We have reached the conclusion that it could not.’ His judgment was as follows.

Influence
The judgment of the case and its summary have often been cited by many legal organisations and unions to explain workers' rights when they are made redundant, and in some cases when this judgment may not apply.

See also

UK labour law

References

Employment Appeal Tribunal cases
1982 in case law
1982 in British law